Trans Thane Creek, also popularly called TTC, is a creek running between Thane and Navi Mumbai. It is popularly known as Thane- Belapur Road. It is a huge industrial area near Mumbai. The nearest hill stations are Matheran and Karjat.

Roads in Maharashtra
Geography of Thane district
Estuaries of India
Economy of Maharashtra
Transport in Navi Mumbai
Transport in Thane